The Moluccan boobook or Moluccan hawk-owl group (Ninox spp.), are a group of owls in the family Strigidae. They are found in Indonesia. Once consider a single species, the four species are now considered part of a species complex.  Natural habitat for all species is subtropical or tropical moist lowland forests.

Taxonomy

Species
Most taxonomists recognize four species:
 Ninox forbesi (PL Sclater, 1883) - Tanimbar boobook - Tanimbar Islands
 Ninox hypogramma (GR Gray, 1861) - Halmahera boobook - northern Maluku Islands of Halmahera, Ternate, and Bacan
 Ninox squamipila (Bonaparte, 1850) - Seram boobook- Seram Island in the southern Maluku Islands
 Ninox hantu (Wallace, 1863) - Buru boobook - Buru Island in the southern Maluku Islands

References

Ninox
Bird common names
Taxonomy articles created by Polbot